Peter Dennis Skipper (11 April 1958 – 23 April 2019) was an English footballer who played as a central defender.

Skipper turned professional when he signed for Hull City in January 1979. He then had spells at Scunthorpe United and Darlington before returning to Hull in August 1982. He made over 300 appearances for the club, scoring 19 goals. He moved to Oldham Athletic in 1988, and went to play for Walsall and Wrexham before finishing his career at Wigan Athletic.

Skipper died of complications caused by a stroke on 23 April 2019, at the age of 61.

References

External links
Peter Skipper at Hull City official website

1958 births
2019 deaths
Footballers from Kingston upon Hull
Association football defenders
English footballers
Hull City A.F.C. players
Scunthorpe United F.C. players
Darlington F.C. players
Oldham Athletic A.F.C. players
Walsall F.C. players
Wrexham A.F.C. players
Wigan Athletic F.C. players
Stafford Rangers F.C. players
English Football League players